Liu Xinyu (born 26 August 1999) is a Chinese footballer currently playing as a midfielder for China League One side Sichuan Jiuniu.

Career statistics

Club

References

1999 births
Living people
Chinese footballers
Association football midfielders
Chinese Super League players
China League One players
Beijing Renhe F.C. players